Oddný Guðbjörg Harðardóttir (born 9 April 1957 in Reykjavík) is an Icelandic politician representing the Social Democratic Alliance. She served as Minister of Finance from 2011 to 2012, and twice as parliamentary group leader for the SDA. On 17 March 2016, she declared her candidacy for the party's leadership election, which took place at an extraordinary party conference on 3–4 June, and she was elected party chairman.

She resigned as party leader on 31 October 2016 after her party suffered their worst results in the 2016 election (falling to only three seats), and was replaced by deputy leader Logi Már Einarsson.

References

 Non auto-biography of Oddný G. Harðardóttir on the parliament website

Hardardottir, Oddny G.
Hardardottir, Oddny G.
Members of the Althing
Women government ministers of Iceland
Finance ministers of Iceland
Politicians from Reykjavík
Hardardottir, Oddny G.
Social Democratic Party (Iceland) politicians